The 1872 United States presidential election in Michigan took place on November 5, 1872, as part of the 1872 United States presidential election. Voters chose 11 electors to the Electoral College, which selected the president and vice president.

Michigan again went for Republican incumbent Ulysses S. Grant, increasing his margin of victory over his challenger (Liberal Republican Horace Greeley) to more than 27%.

Results

See also
 United States presidential elections in Michigan

References

Michigan
1872
1872 Michigan elections